El Producto is the debut extended play (EP) by Australian electronic music group the Avalanches. It was released on 8 December 1997 via Wondergram Records and distributed by Shock Records. El Producto was the second release by the group, and included a different, extended version of their debut single, "Rock City", which had appeared on Trifekta Records two months prior. 

During this time, the band "started performing widely and attracted a long term recording deal." Based on the EP's success, Steve Pavlovic, head of Wondergram Records, signed the group to his new Modular Recordings label in May 1998. An alternate, extended version of "Rolling High" appeared on the Homebake Festival's Homebake 98 compilation album. Additionally, the band contributed a cover of "Do You Know The Way To San Jose" for the 1998 compilation album To Hal And Bacharach, which was performed in much the same style as the songs on El Producto. 

The Avalanches also signed with Rex Records for the exclusive United Kingdom four-track EP Undersea Community, which appeared in March 1999 and marked a change in style as the group moved away from the indie hip hop approach of their earlier work. They released their debut full-length album, Since I Left You, on Modular in November 2000.

Production
The Avalanches sampled material from vinyl records found in thrift-stores in the creation of their music, including the songs in El Producto. Group members, Robbie Chater and Darren Seltmann, primarily worked with a Yamaha Promix 01 and Akai S2000 samplers. The EP also contained original input from the band, featuring original instrumentation played by the group's members.

Track listing

Personnel
Musicians
 DJ Dexter – scratching
 Darren Seltmann – vocals

Production
 The Avalanches – recording
 David Briggs – mastering
 Matt Gearing-Thomas – mixing
 Richard Robinson – recording
 Sebatron – recording

Credits adapted from El Producto liner notes.

References

1997 EPs
The Avalanches albums